The Movie Song Album is a 1966 studio album by Tony Bennett. The album consists of songs from films, opening with the theme from The Oscar, in which Bennett had recently appeared. With this project of such high quality of song material and collaborators, he was to describe the album in his autobiography as his "all time favorite record".

Johnny Mandel was the musical director, and he and Neal Hefti and Quincy Jones arranged and conducted their own compositions on the album.  Luiz Bonfá played the guitar on his two songs, "Samba de Orfeu" and "The Gentle Rain". The pianists Tommy Flanagan, Jimmy Rowles and Lou Levy all collaborated, each on one song.

Bennett's recording of "The Shadow of Your Smile" won Mandel and Paul Francis Webster the Grammy Award for Song of the Year at the Grammy Awards of 1966, and Bennett performed the song at the 38th Academy Awards, where it won the Academy Award for Best Original Song.

Track listing 
 "Maybe September" (from The Oscar) (Ray Evans, Percy Faith, Jay Livingston) – 4:03
 "Girl Talk" (from Harlow) (Neal Hefti, Bobby Troup) – 3:14
 "The Gentle Rain" (from The Gentle Rain) (Luiz Bonfá, Matt Dubey) – 2:12
 "Emily" (from The Americanization of Emily) (Johnny Mandel, Johnny Mercer) – 3:25
 "The Pawnbroker" (from The Pawnbroker) (Quincy Jones, Jack Lawrence) – 3:08
 "Samba de Orfeu" (from Black Orpheus) (Bonfá) – 2:08
 "The Shadow of Your Smile" (from The Sandpiper) (Mandel, Paul Francis Webster) – 3:38
 "Smile" (from Modern Times) (Charlie Chaplin, Geoffrey Claremont Parsons, John Turner) – 3:34
 "The Second Time Around" (from High Time) (Sammy Cahn, Jimmy Van Heusen) – 2:44
 "Days of Wine and Roses" (from Days of Wine and Roses) (Henry Mancini, Mercer) – 2:58
 "Never Too Late" (from Never Too Late) (Evans, Livingston, Rose) – 3:25
 "The Trolley Song" (from Meet Me in St. Louis) (Ralph Blane, Hugh Martin) – 2:35

Personnel

Performance 
 Tony Bennett - vocals
 Neal Hefti, Quincy Jones, Johnny Mandel, David Rose - arranger, conductor
 Larry Wilcox, Al Cohn - arranger
 Tommy Flanagan, Lou Levy, Jimmy Rowles - piano
 Luiz Bonfá - guitar
 Zoot Sims - tenor sax (on track 12)

References 

Tony Bennett albums
Albums arranged by Neal Hefti
Albums arranged by Quincy Jones
Albums arranged by Johnny Mandel
Columbia Records albums
1966 albums
Albums conducted by Neal Hefti
Albums conducted by Quincy Jones